Floortje Meijners (born 16 January 1987 in Oldenzaal, Overijssel) is a volleyball player from the Netherlands, who plays as a wing-spiker. She was a member of the Dutch National Women's Team that won the gold medal at the FIVB World Grand Prix 2007 in Ningbo, PR China. 

Starting from 2010, she played in Italy at Busto Arsizio, where she remained until 2012, when she moved to River Volley Piacenza. After one year at Turkish team Galatasaray Daikin Istanbul (2014-2015), she is now playing again for the Italian team Nordmeccanica Piacenza.

References
FIVB Profile  
Profile  
http://www.legavolleyfemminile.it/DettaglioAtleta.asp?IdAtleta=MEI-FLO-87 

1987 births
Living people
People from Oldenzaal
Dutch women's volleyball players
Galatasaray S.K. (women's volleyball) players
Expatriate volleyball players in Italy
Expatriate volleyball players in Turkey
Dutch expatriate sportspeople in Italy
Dutch expatriate sportspeople in Turkey
Wing spikers
20th-century Dutch women
21st-century Dutch women
Sportspeople from Overijssel